Steal This Record is the fourth studio album by the Detroit, Michigan punk rock band The Suicide Machines, released in 2001 by Hollywood Records. It was the band's last album for the Hollywood label, as they moved to Side One Dummy Records the following year. It was also their last album with longtime bassist Royce Nunley, who left the group in 2002. The album's musical direction continues with the pop punk style the band had explored on their previous album The Suicide Machines but a bit heavier with some elements of hardcore from their early albums and a sort of return to more political lyrics instead of the more lighthearted lyrics of the previous album, in addition to an attempt at a reggae inspired track.

Background 
The album attempted to get back into the more punk sounding songs, but they had difficulty adjusting back to this sound due to Nunley still being into the style the self titled album had, though Lukacinsky was getting back into writing more punk sounding songs. The tensions from the behind the scenes of the last album were still there, as Lukacinsky and Nunley still hated each other.

The single "The Killing Blow" was not put on the radio or given a video due to the timing of it, since the September 11 attacks were not that long before the release of the album and Hollywood was afraid to turn a song with that title in.

The song “Brass Ring” was originally meant for this album but got cut. It later appeared on The Least Worst of the Suicide Machines as one of the unreleased tracks and on the Japanese version of the album.

Track listing
All songs written by The Suicide Machines except where noted.

Personnel
 Jason Navarro – vocals
 Dan Lukacinsky – guitar, backing vocals
 Royce Nunley – bass, backing vocals
 Ryan Vandeberghe – drums
 Toby Morse (of the band H2O) – additional vocals on "It's The End Of The World As We Know It"

Technical
 Julian Raymond – producer
 Greg Goldman – engineer
 John Aguto – engineer
 Mark Valentine – assistant engineer
 Brian Humphrey – assistant engineer
 Chris Lord-Alge – mixing
 Brian Gardener – mastering
 Shannon Crawford – cover painting
 Enny Joo – design
 Terri Phillips – photography

References

The Suicide Machines albums
Hollywood Records albums
2001 albums
Albums produced by Julian Raymond